Truth is a 2013 American psychological thriller film directed and written by Rob Moretti and starring Sean Paul Lockhart, Blanche Baker, and Rob Moretti. It was filmed in  Englewood Cliffs, New Jersey and Montclair, New Jersey, United States.

Plot
After a chance encounter over the internet, Caleb (Sean Paul Lockhart), who suffers from borderline personality disorder, meets and falls head over heels for Jeremy (Rob Moretti), and soon the line between love and lies blur. Struggling to keep his past a secret, including his mentally ill mother, Caleb slowly succumbs to his darker side. A sudden turn of events finds Jeremy held captive, until Caleb's quest for the truth is revealed.

Cast
 Sean Paul Lockhart ... Caleb Jacobs
 Rob Moretti ... Jeremy Dorian
 Blanche Baker ... Dr. Carter Moore
 Suzanne Didonna ... Caleb's mother
 Rebekah Aramini ... Leah
 Max Rhyser ... Young man in the cafe
 Philip Joseph McElroy ... Young Caleb
 John Van Steen ... Orderly

Critical reception
Truth garnered mixed to negative reviews. At Metacritic, the film scored a 23, based on 4 reviews.

Inkoo Kang of Village Voice wrote "Truth is hammier than Easter brunch, but its depictions of rejection transfiguring into violence are always affecting and distressing."

Frank Scheck of The Hollywood Reporter said, "Its Hitchcockian aspirations are sabotaged by a tendency towards lurid melodrama that is more laughable than chilling."

Jay Weissberg of Variety commented: "A low-budget potboiler with an overblown score not loud enough to drown out the hackneyed dialogue."

Jeannette Catsoulis of The New York Times wrote of the story, "Filled with sappy dialogue and screeching strings, Truth is a puerile excavation of secrets and sickness."

References

External links
 

2013 films
American psychological thriller films
Borderline personality disorder in fiction
Films shot in New Jersey
American LGBT-related films
LGBT-related drama films
2013 LGBT-related films
2013 psychological thriller films
Gay-related films
2010s English-language films
2010s American films